Ratelle is a surname. Notable people with the surname include:

J.-Georges Ratelle (1883–1969), Canadian politician
Jean Ratelle (born 1940), Canadian ice hockey player